The 2022 Women's Baltic Cup was the 22nd edition of the Women's Baltic Cup, an international women's football tournament contested by the Baltic States. The tournament was hosted by Estonia from 6 to 9 October 2022.

Defending champions Lithuania who won 2021 Baltic Women's Cup as hosts, were eliminated in the semi-finals (first round) by Estonia, despite finishing third after beating Latvia in 3rd place play-off match.

Hosts Estonia secured a place in the final, having last won the tournament in 2014. Estonia clinched the title by beating Faroe Islands 3–1  in the final, held at Tamme Stadium in Tartu.

Participating nations
All Baltic States plus the Faroe Islands entered the tournament.

Venues
Matches will be held in two venues.

Match officials
the selected match officials for this tournament.

Referees
  Juri Frischer
  Reelika Turi
  Viola Raudzina
  Sarah Fatemeh Zangeneh

Assistant referees
  Sidsel Dall
  Sander Saga
  Neeme Neemlaid
  Silver Kõiv
  Karolin Kaivoja
  Diana Vanaga-Araja
  Marita Vitola
  Line Cathrine Nymoen

Knockout stage

Semi-finals

Third place match

Final

Goalscorers

Awards

Final ranking

References

Baltic
2022 in Estonian football
Baltic Cup (football)
Women's international association football competitions
Women's football competitions in Estonia
International association football competitions hosted by Estonia